Arjun Azad (born 8 August 2001) is an Indian cricketer. He made his List A debut on 1 October 2019, for Chandigarh in the 2019–20 Vijay Hazare Trophy.

References

External links
 

2001 births
Living people
Indian cricketers
Chandigarh cricketers
Place of birth missing (living people)